Gopalpur Assembly constituency is one of 243 legislative assembly constituencies of the legislative assembly of Bihar. It is a part of the Bhagalpur lok sabha constituency along with other assembly constituencies viz Bihpur, Pirpainti, Kahalgaon, Bhagalpur and Nathnagar.
The town of Gopalpur, Bihar is part of this constituency.

Overview
Gopalpur comprises CD Blocks Gopalpur, Naugachhia, Rangra Chowk & Ismailpur.

Members of Legislative Assembly

Election results

2020

2015

2010

References

External links
 

Politics of Bhagalpur district
Assembly constituencies of Bihar